The 1996 Asian Judo Championships were held in Ho Chi Minh City, Vietnam 9 to 10 November 1996.

Medal overview

Men's events

Women's events

Medals table

References

External links
 
 Judo Union of Asia

Asian Championships
Asian Judo Championships
Asian Judo Championships
International sports competitions hosted by Vietnam
20th century in Ho Chi Minh City
Judo competitions in Vietnam